Dipsas vermiculata, the vermiculate snail-eater, is a non-venomous snake found in Ecuador, Peru, and Colombia.

References

Dipsas
Snakes of South America]
Reptiles of Ecuador
Reptiles of Peru
Reptiles of Colombia
Reptiles described in 1960
Taxa named by James A. Peters